Kimberly Hunt is an American broadcast journalist.

Kimberly Hunt or Kim Hunt may also refer to:

Kim Hunt, Canadian drummer, member of Zon (band) as well as Urgent and Moxy

See also
Hunt (disambiguation)